Football is the most popular sport, both in terms of participants and spectators, in Zagreb. Zagreb has several of Croatia's significant football clubs.

Introduction
GNK Dinamo Zagreb is Zagreb's most successful club.

Maksimir Stadium, Dinamo's home ground is located in the city centre. It is also the home venue of the Croatia national football team.

History 
Football was popularized in Zagreb by Franjo Bučar in the late 19th century. The earliest clubs were founded before World War I - HAŠK and PNIŠK in 1903, Concordia in 1906 and Građanski in 1911. First league competition in Croatia started in Zagreb in 1912. After World War I Zagreb clubs joined the Yugoslav First League, with Građanski, Concordia and HAŠK becoming yugoslav champions. In 1945 old clubs were dissolved and new, the likes of Dinamo, Zagreb and Lokomotiva, were founded by the socialist regime. Dinamo later became four time champion of Yugoslavia.

Clubs 
The table below lists all Zagreb clubs.

Active

Defunct

Honours 
 Croatian Football Champions (22)
 Dinamo (21)
 Zagreb (1)
 Yugoslav Football Champions (12)
 Građanski (5)
 Dinamo (4)
 Concordia (2)
 HAŠK (1)
 Croatian Cup (15)
 Dinamo (15)
 Yugoslav Cup (8)
 Dinamo (7)
 Građanski (1)
 Croatian Super Cup (6)
 Dinamo (6)

Zagreb derbies 
There were major Zagreb derbies before World War II between Građanski, HAŠK and Concordia. In the period from 1945 until 1960 the main city derby was between Dinamo and Lokomotiva.

Stadia 
 Stadion Kranjčevićeva
 Stadion Maksimir
 Stadion Lučko
 Stadion NŠC Stjepan Spajić
 Stadion ŠC Rudeš

See also
Football in Croatia

References
Zagreb in Football Lexicon

Football in Croatia
Sport in Zagreb